Fábio Silva may refer to:

 Fabio Silva (footballer, born 1977), Brazilian football midfielder
 Fábio Silva (footballer, born 1980) (Fábio Carleandro da Silva), Brazilian footballer
 Fábio Silva (fighter) (born 1982), Brazilian mixed martial artist
 Fábio (footballer, born 1983) (Fábio do Nascimento Silva), Brazilian footballer
 Fábio (footballer, born October 1984) (José Fábio da Silva), Brazilian footballer
 Fábio Ferreira (footballer, born 1984) (Fábio Ferreira da Silva), Brazilian footballer
 Fábio Silva (footballer, born 1985) (Fábio Emanuel Moreira Silva), Cape Verdean footballer
 Fábio (footballer, born 1990) (Fábio Pereira da Silva), Brazilian footballer
 Fábio da Silva Bordignon (born 1992), Brazilian paralympic athlete
 Fábio Silva (footballer, born 2002) (Fábio Daniel Soares Silva), Portuguese footballer